Hoarding: Buried Alive is an American documentary television series that premiered on TLC on March 14, 2010. The show follows hoarders through their life experiences and helps them learn to manage their illness.

Overview
Hoarding: Buried Alive takes the viewer into the personal lives of hoarders, focusing on how the mental illness has affected the individual and his or her family members.  Each episode usually looks at two different cases, examining the history of the victim and interviewing family members.  The show includes an extensive look at the items each person collects. Each hoarder receives treatment from a therapist and a professional organizer.  These professionals help them through the process of ridding their house of the hoard.  By the end of each episode, the hoarders typically have shown signs of improvement that make the viewer hopeful for their continuing success.

Episodes

Season 1

Season 2
Episodes of season 2 aired in two parts, from August 8, 2010 to October 3, 2010, and from March 2, 2011 to April 20, 2011.

Season 3

Season 4

Season 5

Analysis
Hoarding: Buried Alive is an example of a reality TV rehabilitation program, a category of show that has been extremely popular since 2000. However, the ability of these shows to treat people effectively is often questioned.  Some focus on the fact that these shows do get people into some rehabilitation program.  It is obviously better than them continuing their addictive behaviors without professional guidance.  However, the presence of the cameras can influence the way the patients act.  They may exaggerate certain emotions or fail to share essential information for fear of it coming back to haunt them once the show is aired.  These additions and omissions could greatly impair their ability to recover and move forward in the process.

In addition to the information regarding the disease being provided in the show, many of these programs help people get in contact with organizations that can provide treatment or more information on the disease.  This can help viewers get a better picture of the disorders depicted and combats the stigma that surrounds mental illness.

Hoarding paints a picture of compulsive hoarders that makes viewers sympathize with them.  It helps people understand that it is an illness.  When these individuals enter a rehab program, the quality of their lives and the lives of their families can improve drastically.  It also provides a view of the disease that is not totally bent on feeding the human appetite for horror.  Instead, it focuses more on giving an accurate look at the illness.  It picks cases that are not overly extreme or graphic and doesn’t dwell completely on the disturbing things that the patient has collected.  It focuses on conveying the ugly truth about the illness, focusing on the way it affects both the afflicted individual and their family.

See also
 Hoarders (TV series)

References

External links
 
 

2010 American television series debuts
2010s American reality television series
English-language television shows
TLC (TV network) original programming
Compulsive hoarding
2014 American television series endings